John William Hammer  (born 27 September 1935) is the founder of several sporting competitions for older players.

John Hammer was born in Sunbury, Victoria, Australia.

In 1963 John joined the Victorian Football League (VFL) Reserve Grade as a field umpire. In 1967 was promoted to the senior list and umpired 16 Victorian Country Football League matches.

He founded Superules, an Australian rules football competition for those over 35 years of age at a meeting at the Zero Inn, Nhill, Victoria in 1980. A football carnival is held at a different location in Australia each year.

Hammer also founded Over 60s cricket in Australia in 2003, promoting cricket for those over 60 years of age.

In 2009, Hammer was awarded an ICC Centenary Volunteer Medal for his services to cricket.

In May 2010, Hammer founded the Mid-Year Cricket Association (MYCA) in Victoria, Australia, which plays cricket matches on synthetic wickets during May to August. MYCA now has 86 teams from 62 clubs. Hammer has been president from 2010 – 2015.

He was awarded the OAM for his services to cricket and seniors' sport in the 2017 Birthday Honours.

John

External links
Masters Australian Football Minutes of first meeting of Superules, 1 March 1981 (under "History" button)
Never Too Old mentions newspaper article (October 2007) on Over 60s cricket and John Hammer

References

1935 births
Living people
Australian sports executives and administrators
Recipients of the Medal of the Order of Australia
People from Sunbury, Victoria